Marquavis Goolsby (born July 29, 1992), better known by his stage name Dae Dae, is an American rapper from Atlanta, Georgia. He is known for his debut single "Wat U Mean (Aye, Aye, Aye)."

Early life
Dae Dae grew up in Atlanta's Boulevard Fourth Ward. He found early interest in music at about 8 years old, when his estranged father, John Burton, bought him Bow Wow and Lil Romeo CDs. At age fourteen, Dae Dae dropped out of school and became a father for the first time. Still interested in music and rapping, Dae Dae's father converted a room in their home to a recording studio for him. Shortly after, police arrested his father for having drugs in the home, and confiscated the studio equipment when his father was unable to provide receipts for their purchase. Left with nothing, Dae Dae quickly got a job doing concrete and flooring work, saving all of his earned money to record at a local studio and participate in weekly open mic nights. He eventually met his manager Anthem, who knew Atlanta based producer Nitti, and was offered a record deal from Nitti Beatz Recordings.

Career

2015–present
Dae Dae released his first single, "Wat U Mean (Aye, Aye, Aye)" in 2015. He wrote the song while at work, freestyling lines in his head and writing them in his iPhone before calling his producer and recording the song later that day. After signing with 300 Entertainment in 2016, Dae Dae released a mixtape titled 4 Reasons, which features cameos from artists such as Rich Homie Quan. In February 2016, Dae Dae released the single "Spend It", which was later remixed by Lil Wayne and 2 Chainz. The song was produced by Young Trill Beatz. A music video for "Spend It" was released in November 2016. Dae Dae joined Young Thug's May 2016 Hi-Tunes tour throughout the United States along with TM88 and Rich The Kid. An official remix of "Wat U Mean" featuring Lil Yachty was released in July 2016. Dae Dae's third single "Dej Loaf" was released in August 2016. In January 2017, he released the single "Dem Days" and was named one of FACT Magazine's 10 Rappers to Watch in 2017.

Success of "Wat U Mean"

The popularity of Dae Dae's "Wat U Mean" had been steadily increasing since its 2015 release, especially after being remixed by Young Dro. The song was the top song discovered via Shazam in Atlanta in early 2016. In May 2016, a video of a dancer named Matthew King dancing to the song went viral via Twitter, further increasing its exposure and popularity. During the week of June 11, 2016, it was featured on Billboard's Twitter Emerging Artists chart at No. 24. He performed the song live at the 2016 BET Hip Hop Awards.

Arrest:
In June 2021, Dae Dae was arrested for stabbing a 17 year old Dunkin Donuts employee in December 2020, because the store was out of what he wanted. https://www.11alive.com/article/news/local/union-city/atlanta-rapper-dae-dae-wanted-in-dunkin-stabbing-arrested/85-a016c856-531b-4760-ae38-b41ee87347f4

Discography

Mixtapes
4 Reasons (2016)
The DefAnition (with London on da Track) (2016)
5 Reasons (2017)

Singles

As lead artist

Notes

References

External links
 
 
 
 
 

1992 births
Living people
African-American male rappers
Rappers from Atlanta
Southern hip hop musicians
African-American songwriters
Songwriters from Georgia (U.S. state)
21st-century American rappers
21st-century American male musicians
21st-century African-American musicians
American male songwriters